Annabestan (also Romanized as ‘Annābestān) is a village in Tabas Rural District, in the Central District of Khoshab County, Razavi Khorasan Province, Iran. At the 2006 census, its population was 81, in 34 families.

See also 

 List of cities, towns and villages in Razavi Khorasan Province

References 

Populated places in Khoshab County